Wail is a commune in the Pas-de-Calais department in the Hauts-de-France region of France.

Geography
Wail is located 21 miles (33 km) southeast of Montreuil-sur-Mer, at the D98 and D340 road junction, 4miles (6k) east of Hesdin.

Population

Places of interest
 The church of St. Martin, dating from the eighteenth century.

See also
Communes of the Pas-de-Calais department

References

Communes of Pas-de-Calais
Artois